Vishnu, also known as Narayana and Hari, is one of the principal deities of Hinduism. He is the supreme being within Vaishnavism, one of the major traditions within contemporary Hinduism.

Vishnu is known as "The Preserver" within the Trimurti, the triple deity of supreme divinity that includes Brahma and Shiva.  In Vaishnavism, Vishnu is the supreme being who creates, protects, and transforms the universe. In the Shaktism tradition, the Goddess, or Adi Shakti, is described as the supreme Para Brahman, yet Vishnu is revered along with Shiva and Brahma. Tridevi is stated to be the energy and creative power (Shakti) of each, with Lakshmi being the equal complementary partner of Vishnu. He is one of the five equivalent deities in Panchayatana puja of the Smarta tradition of Hinduism.

According to Vaishnavism, the highest form of Ishvara is with qualities (Saguna), and have certain form, but is limitless, transcendent and unchanging absolute Brahman, and the primal Atman (Self) of the universe. There are many both benevolent and fearsome depictions of Vishnu. In benevolent aspects, he is depicted as an omniscient being sleeping on the coils of the serpent Adishesha (who represents time) floating in the primeval ocean of milk called Kshira Sagara with his consort, Lakshmi.

Whenever the world is threatened with evil, chaos, and destructive forces, Vishnu descends in the form of an avatar (incarnation) to restore the cosmic order, and protect dharma. The Dashavatara are the ten primary avatars (incarnations) of Vishnu. Out of these ten, Rama and Krishna are the most important.

Nomenclature
Vishnu (or Viṣṇu) means 'all pervasive' and, according to Medhātith ( CE), 'one who is everything and inside everything'. Vedanga scholar Yaska (4th century BCE) in the Nirukta defines Vishnu as viṣṇur viṣvater vā vyaśnoter vā ('one who enters everywhere'); also adding atha yad viṣito bhavati tad viṣnurbhavati ('that which is free from fetters and bondage is Vishnu').

In the tenth part of the Padma Purana (4-15th century CE), Danta (Son of Bhīma and King of Vidarbha) lists 108 names of Vishnu (17.98–102). These include the ten primary avatars (see Dashavarara, below) and descriptions of the qualities, attributes, or aspects of God.

The Garuda Purana (chapter XV) and the "Anushasana Parva" of the Mahabharata both list over 1000 names for Vishnu, each name describing a quality, attribute, or aspect of God. Known as the Vishnu Sahasranama, Vishnu here is defined as 'the omnipresent'.

Other notable names in this list include :

 Hari 
 Lakshmikanta
 Jagannatha 
 Janardana
 Govinda
 Hrishikesha
 Padmanabha
 Mukunda

Iconography 
Vishnu iconography shows him with dark blue, blue-gray or black coloured skin, and as a well-dressed jewelled man. He is typically shown with four arms, but two armed representations are also found in Hindu texts on artworks.

The historic identifiers of his icon include his image holding a conch shell (shankha named Panchajanya) between the first two fingers of one hand (left back), a chakra – war discus named Sudarshana – in another (right back). The conch shell is spiral and symbolizes all of interconnected spiraling cyclic existence, while the discus symbolizes him as that which restores dharma with war if necessary when cosmic equilibrium is overwhelmed by evil. One of his arms sometimes carries a gada (club, mace named Kaumodaki) which symbolizes authority and power of knowledge. In the fourth arm, he holds a lotus flower (padma) which symbolizes purity and transcendence. The items he holds in various hands varies, giving rise to twenty four combinations of iconography, each combination representing a special form of Vishnu. Each of these special forms is given a special name in texts such as the Agni Purana and Padma Purana. These texts, however, are inconsistent. Rarely, Vishnu is depicted bearing the bow Sharanga or the sword Nandaka. He is depicted with the Kaustubha gem in a necklace and wearing Vaijayanti, a garland of forest flowers. The shrivatsa mark is depicted on his chest in the form of a curl of hair. He generally wears yellow garments. He wears a crown called the Kiritamukuta.

Vishnu iconography show him either in standing pose, seated in a yoga pose, or reclining. A traditional depiction of Vishnu is that of him reclining on the coils of the serpent Shesha, accompanied by his consort Lakshmi, as he "dreams the universe into reality."

The Trimurti 

Particularly in Vaishnavism, the Trimurti (also known as the Hindu Triad or Great Trinity) represents the three fundamental forces (guṇas) through which the universe is created, maintained, and destroyed in cyclic succession. Each of these forces is represented by a Hindu deity:

 Brahma: presiding deity of Rajas (passion, creation)
 Vishnu: presiding deity of Sattva (goodness, preservation)
 Shiva: presiding deity of Tamas (darkness, destruction)
The trimurti themselves are beyond three gunas and are not affected by it.

In Hindu tradition, the trio is often referred to as Brahma-Vishnu-Mahesh. All have the same meaning of three in One; different forms or manifestations of One person the Supreme Being.

Avatars

The concept of the avatar (or incarnation) within Hinduism is most often associated with Vishnu, the preserver or sustainer aspect of God within the Hindu Trimurti. The avatars of Vishnu descend to empower the good and to destroy evil, thereby restoring Dharma and relieving the burden of the Earth. An oft-quoted passage from the Bhagavad Gita describes the typical role of an avatar of Vishnu:

Vedic literature, in particular the Puranas ('ancient'; similar to encyclopedias) and Itihasa ('chronicle, history, legend'), narrate numerous avatars of Vishnu. The most well-known of these avatars are Krishna (most notably in the Vishnu Purana, Bhagavata Purana, and Mahabharata; the latter encompassing the Bhagavad Gita), and Rama (most notably in the Ramayana). Krishna in particular is venerated in Vaishnavism as the ultimate, primeval, transcendental source of all existence, including all the other demigods and gods such as Vishnu.

The Mahabharata 
In the Mahabharata, Vishnu (as Narayana) states to Narada that He will appear in the following ten incarnations:

The Puranas 
Specified avatars of Vishnu are listed against some of the Puranas in the table below. However, this is a complicated process and the lists are unlikely to be exhaustive because:

 Not all Puranas provide lists per se (e.g. the Agni Purana dedicates entire chapters to avatars, and some of these chapters mention other avatars within them)
 A list may be given in one place but additional avatars may be mentioned elsewhere (e.g. the Bhagavata Purana lists 22 avatars in Canto 1, but mentions others elsewhere) 
Manava Purana, the only Upa Purana listed 42 avatars of Vishnu.
 A personality in one Purana may be considered an avatar in another (e.g. Narada is not specified as an avatar in the Matsya Purana but is in the Bhagavata Purana)
 Some avatars consist of two or more people considered as different aspects of a single incarnation (e.g. Nara-Narayana, Rama and his three brothers)

Dashavatara

The Dashavatara is a list of the so-called Vibhavas, or '10 [primary] Avatars' of Vishnu. The Agni Purana, Varaha Purana, Padma Purana, Linga Purana, Narada Purana, Garuda Purana, and Skanda Purana all provide matching lists. The same Vibhavas are also found in the Garuda Purana Saroddhara, a commentary or ‘extracted essence’ written by Navanidhirama about the Garuda Purana (i.e. not the Purana itself, with which it seems to be confused):

Apparent disagreements concerning the placement of either the Buddha or Balarama in the Dashavarara seems to occur from the Dashavarara list in the Shiva Purana (the only other list with ten avatars including Balarama in the Garuda Purana substitutes Vamana, not Buddha). Regardless, both versions of the Dashavarara have a scriptural basis in the canon of authentic Vedic literature (but not from the Garuda Purana Saroddhara).

Perumal

Perumal—also known as Thirumal, or Mayon (as described in the Tamil scriptures)— was accepted as a manifestation of Vishnu during the process of the syncretism of South Indian deities into mainstream Hinduism. He is a popular Hindu deity among Tamilians in Tamil Nadu, as well among the Tamil diaspora. Revered by the Sri Vaishnava denomination of Hinduism, Perumal is venerated in popular tradition as Venkateshwara at Tirupati, and Sri Ranganathaswamy at Srirangam.

Literature

Vedas
Vishnu is a Rigvedic deity, but not a prominent one when compared to Indra, Agni and others. Just 5 out of 1028 hymns of the Rigveda are dedicated to Vishnu, although he is mentioned in other hymns. Vishnu is mentioned in the Brahmana layer of text in the Vedas, thereafter his profile rises and over the history of Indian scriptures, states Jan Gonda, Vishnu becomes a divinity of the highest rank, one equivalent to the Supreme Being.

Though a minor mention and with overlapping attributes in the Vedas, he has important characteristics in various hymns of Rig Veda, such as 1.154.5, 1.56.3 and 10.15.3. In these hymns, the Vedic scriptures assert that Vishnu resides in that highest home where departed Atman (Self) reside, an assertion that may have been the reason for his increasing emphasis and popularity in Hindu soteriology. He is also described in the Vedic literature as the one who supports heaven and earth.

In the Vedic hymns, Vishnu is invoked alongside other deities, especially Indra, whom he helps in killing the symbol of evil named Vritra. His distinguishing characteristic in Vedas is his association with light. Two Rigvedic hymns in Mandala 7 refer to Vishnu. In section 7.99 of the Rigveda, Vishnu is addressed as the god who separates heaven and earth, a characteristic he shares with Indra. In the Vedic texts, the deity or god referred to as Vishnu is Surya or Savitr (Sun god), who also bears the name Suryanarayana. Again, this link to Surya is a characteristic Vishnu shares with fellow Vedic deities named Mitra and Agni, wherein different hymns, they too "bring men together" and cause all living beings to rise up and impel them to go about their daily activities.

In hymn 7.99 of Rigveda, Indra-Vishnu is equivalent and produce the sun, with the verses asserting that this sun is the source of all energy and light for all. In other hymns of the Rigveda, Vishnu is a close friend of Indra. Elsewhere in Rigveda, Atharvaveda and Upanishadic texts, Vishnu is equivalent to Prajapati, both are described as the protector and preparer of the womb, and according to Klaus Klostermaier, this may be the root behind the post-Vedic fusion of all the attributes of the Vedic Prajapati unto the avatars of Vishnu.

In the Yajurveda, Taittiriya Aranyaka (10.13.1), "Narayana sukta", Narayana is mentioned as the supreme being. The first verse of "Narayana Suktam" mentions the words paramam padam, which literally mean 'highest post' and may be understood as the 'supreme abode for all Selfs'. This is also known as Param Dhama, Paramapadam, or Vaikuntha. Rigveda 1.22.20 also mentions the same paramam padam.

In the Atharvaveda, the mythology of a boar who raises goddess earth from the depths of cosmic ocean appears, but without the word Vishnu or his alternate avatar names. In post-Vedic mythology, this legend becomes one of the basis of many cosmogonic myth called the Varaha legend, with Varaha as an avatar of Vishnu.

Trivikrama: The Three Steps of Vishnu

Several hymns of the Rigveda repeat the mighty deed of Vishnu called the Trivikrama, which is one of the lasting mythologies in Hinduism since the Vedic times. It is an inspiration for ancient artwork in numerous Hindu temples such as at the Ellora Caves, which depict the Trivikrama legend through the Vamana avatar of Vishnu. Trivikrama refers to the celebrated three steps or "three strides" of Vishnu. Starting as a small insignificant looking being, Vishnu undertakes a herculean task of establishing his reach and form, then with his first step covers the earth, with second the ether, and the third entire heaven.

The Vishnu Sukta 1.154 of Rigveda says that the first and second of Vishnu's strides (those encompassing the earth and air) are visible to the mortals and the third is the realm of the immortals. The Trivikrama describing hymns integrate salvific themes, stating Vishnu to symbolize that which is freedom and life. The Shatapatha Brahmana elaborates this theme of Vishnu, as his herculean effort and sacrifice to create and gain powers that help others, one who realizes and defeats the evil symbolized by the Asuras after they had usurped the three worlds, and thus Vishnu is the saviour of the mortals and the immortals (Devas).

Brahmanas

The Shatapatha Brahmana contains ideas which Vaishnavism tradition of Hinduism has long mapped to a pantheistic vision of Vishnu as supreme, he as the essence in every being and everything in the empirically perceived universe. In this Brahmana, states Klaus Klostermaier, Purusha Narayana (Vishnu) asserts, "all the worlds have I placed within mine own self, and my own self has I placed within all the worlds." The text equates Vishnu to all knowledge there is (Vedas), calling the essence of everything as imperishable, all Vedas and principles of universe as imperishable, and that this imperishable which is Vishnu is the all.

Vishnu is described to be permeating all object and life forms, states S. Giora Shoham, where he is "ever-present within all things as the intrinsic principle of all", and the eternal, transcendental self in every being. The Vedic literature, including its Brahmanas layer, while praising Vishnu do not subjugate others gods and goddesses. They present an inclusive pluralistic henotheism. According to Max Muller, "Although the gods are sometimes distinctly invoked as the great and the small, the young and the old (Rig Veda 1:27:13), this is only an attempt to find the most comprehensive expression for the divine powers and nowhere is any of the gods represented as the subordinate to others. It would be easy to find, in the numerous hymns of the Veda, passages in which almost every single god is represented as supreme and absolute."

Upanishads
The Vaishnava Upanishads are minor Upanishads of Hinduism, related to Vishnu theology. There are 14 Vaishnava Upanishads in the Muktika anthology of 108 Upanishads. It is unclear when these texts were composed, and estimates vary from the 1st-century BCE to 17th-century CE for the texts.

These Upanishads highlight Vishnu, Narayana, Rama or one of his avatars as the supreme metaphysical reality called Brahman in Hinduism. They discuss a diverse range of topics, from ethics to the methods of worship.

Puranas

Vishnu is the primary focus of the Vaishnavism-focused Puranas genre of Hindu texts. Of these, according to Ludo Rocher, the most important texts are the Bhagavata Purana, Vishnu Purana, Nāradeya Purana, Garuda Purana and Vayu Purana. The Purana texts include many versions of cosmologies, mythologies, encyclopedic entries about various aspects of life, and chapters that were medieval era regional Vishnu temples-related tourist guides called .

One version of the cosmology, for example, states that Vishnu's eye is at the Southern Celestial Pole from where he watches the cosmos. In another version found in section 4.80 of the Vayu Purana, he is the Hiranyagarbha, or the golden egg from which were simultaneously born all feminine and masculine beings of the universe.

Vishnu Purana 
The Vishnu Purana presents Vishnu as the central element of its cosmology, unlike some other Puranas where Shiva or Brahma or goddess Shakti are. The reverence and the worship of Vishnu is described in 22 chapters of the first part of Vishnu Purana, along with the profuse use of the synonymous names of Vishnu such as Hari, Janardana, Madhava, Achyuta, Hrishikesha and others.

The Vishnu Purana also discusses the Hindu concept of supreme reality called Brahman in the context of the Upanishads; a discussion that the theistic Vedanta scholar Ramanuja interprets to be about the equivalence of the Brahman with Vishnu, a foundational theology in the Sri Vaishnavism tradition.

Bhagavata Purana 
Vishnu is equated with Brahman in the Bhagavata Purana, such as in verse 1.2.11, as "learned transcendentalists who know the Absolute Truth call this non-dual substance as Brahman, Paramatma and Bhagavan."

The Bhagavata Purana has been the most popular and widely read Purana texts relating to Vishnu avatar Krishna, it has been translated and available in almost all Indian languages. Like other Puranas, it discusses a wide range of topics including cosmology, genealogy, geography, mythology, legend, music, dance, yoga and culture. As it begins, the forces of evil have won a war between the benevolent devas (deities) and evil asuras (demons) and now rule the universe. Truth re-emerges as the Vishnu avatar first makes peace with the demons, understands them and then creatively defeats them, bringing back hope, justice, freedom and good – a cyclic theme that appears in many legends. The Bhagavata Purana is a revered text in Vaishnavism. The Puranic legends of Vishnu have inspired plays and dramatic arts that are acted out over festivals, particularly through performance arts such as the Sattriya, Manipuri dance, Odissi, Kuchipudi, Kathakali, Kathak, Bharatanatyam, Bhagavata Mela and Mohiniyattam.

Other Puranas 
Some versions of the Purana texts, unlike the Vedic and Upanishadic texts, emphasize Vishnu as supreme and on whom other gods depend. Vishnu, for example, is the source of creator deity Brahma in the Vaishnavism-focussed Purana texts. Vishnu's iconography typically shows Brahma being born in a lotus emerging from his navel, who then is described as creating all the forms in the universe, but not the primordial universe itself. In contrast, the Shiva-focussed Puranas describe Brahma and Vishnu to have been created by Ardhanarishvara, that is half Shiva and half Parvati; or alternatively, Brahma was born from Rudra, or Vishnu, Shiva and Brahma creating each other cyclically in different aeons (kalpa).

In some Vaishnava Puranas, Vishnu takes the form of Rudra or commands Rudra to destroy the world, thereafter the entire universe dissolves and along with time, everything is reabsorbed back into Vishnu. The universe is then recreated from Vishnu all over again, starting a new Kalpa. For this the Bhagavata Purana employs the metaphor of Vishnu as a spider and the universe as his web. Other texts offer alternate cosmogenic theories, such as one where the universe and time are absorbed into Shiva.

Agama 
The Agama scripture called the Pancharatra describes a mode of worship of Vishnu.

Sangam and Post-Sangam literature

The Sangam literature refers to an extensive regional collection in the Tamil language, mostly from the early centuries of the common era. These Tamil texts revere Vishnu and his avatars such as Krishna and Rama, as well as other pan-Indian deities such as Shiva, Muruga, Durga, Indra and others. Vishnu is described in these texts as mayon, or "one who is dark or black in color" (in north India, the equivalent word is Krishna). Other terms found for Vishnu in these ancient Tamil genre of literature include mayavan, mamiyon, netiyon, mal and mayan.

Krishna as Vishnu avatar is the primary subject of two post-Sangam Tamil epics Silappadikaram and Manimekalai, each of which was probably composed about the 5th century CE. These Tamil epics share many aspects of the story found in other parts of India, such as those related to baby Krishna such as stealing butter, and teenage Krishna such as teasing girls who went to bathe in a river by hiding their clothes.

Bhakti Movement
Ideas about Vishnu in the mid 1st millennium CE were important to the Bhakti movement theology that ultimately swept India after the 12th century. The Alvars, which literally means "those immersed in God", were Tamil Vaishnava poet-saints who sang praises of Vishnu as they traveled from one place to another. They established temple sites such as Srirangam, and spread ideas about Vaishnavism. Their poems, compiled as Alwar Arulicheyalgal or Divya Prabhandham, developed into an influential scripture for the Vaishnavas. The Bhagavata Purana's references to the South Indian Alvar saints, along with its emphasis on bhakti, have led many scholars to give it South Indian origins, though some scholars question whether this evidence excludes the possibility that bhakti movement had parallel developments in other parts of India.

Vaishnava theology

The Bhagavata Purana summarizes the Vaishnava theology, wherein it frequently discusses the merging of the individual Self with the Absolute Brahman (Ultimate Reality, Supreme Truth), or "the return of Brahman into His own true nature", a distinctly Advaitic or non-dualistic philosophy of Shankara. The concept of moksha is explained as Ekatva ('Oneness') and Sayujya ('Absorption, intimate union'), wherein one is completely lost in Brahman (Self, Supreme Being, one's true nature). This, states Rukmini (1993), is proclamation of "return of the individual Self to the Absolute and its merging into the Absolute", which is unmistakably Advaitic in its trend. In the same passages, the Bhagavata includes a mention of Bhagavan as the object of concentration, thereby presenting the Bhakti path from the three major paths of Hindu spirituality discussed in the Bhagavad Gita.

The theology in the Bhagavad Gita discusses both the sentient and the non-sentient, the Self and the matter of existence. It envisions the universe as the body of Vishnu (Krishna), state Harold Coward and Daniel Maguire. Vishnu in Gita's theology pervades all Selfs, all matter and time. In Sri Vaishnavism sub-tradition, Vishnu and Sri (goddess Lakshmi) are described as inseparable, that they pervade everything together. Both together are the creators, who also pervade and transcend their creation.

The Bhagavata Purana, in many passages, parallels the ideas of Nirguna Brahman and non-duality of Adi Shankara.  For example:

Scholars describe the Vaishnava theology as built on the foundation of non-dualism speculations in Upanishads, and term it as "Advaitic Theism." The Bhagavata Purana suggests that Vishnu and the Self (Atman) in all beings is one. Bryant states that the monism discussed in Bhagavata Purana is certainly built on the Vedanta foundations, but not exactly the same as the monism of Adi Shankara. The Bhagavata asserts, according to Bryant, that the empirical and the spiritual universe are both metaphysical realities, and manifestations of the same Oneness, just like heat and light are "real but different" manifestations of sunlight.

In the Bhakti tradition of Vaishnavism, Vishnu is attributed with numerous qualities such as omniscience, energy, strength, lordship, vigour, and splendour. The Vaishnava tradition started by Madhvacharya considers Vishnu in the form of Krishna to be the supreme creator, personal God, all-pervading, all devouring, one whose knowledge and grace leads to "moksha". In Madhvacharya Vaishnava theology, the supreme Vishnu and the Selfs of living beings are two different realities and nature (dualism), while in Ramanuja's Sri Vaishnavism, they are different but share the same essential nature (qualified non-dualism).

Associated deities

Lakshmi

Lakshmi, the Hindu goddess of wealth, fortune and prosperity (both material and spiritual), is the wife and active energy of Vishnu. She is also called Sri. When Vishnu incarnated on earth as the avatars Rama and Krishna, Lakshmi incarnated as his respective consorts: Sita and Radha or Rukmini.
 Various regional beliefs consider Lakshmi to be manifested as various goddesses, who are considered Vishnu's wives. In South India, Lakshmi is worshipped in two forms — Sridevi and Bhudevi. In Tirupati, Venkateshwara (identified as a form of Vishnu) is depicted with consorts, Lakshmi and Padmavathi.

Garuda

Among Vishnu's primary mounts (vahana) is Garuda, the demigod eagle. Vishnu is commonly depicted as riding on his shoulders. Garuda is also considered as Vedas on which Vishnu travels. Garuda is a sacred bird in Vaishnavism. In the Garuda Purana, Garuda carries Vishnu to save the elephant Gajendra.

Shesha 

One of the primordial beings of creation, Shesha, or Adishesha, is the king of the serpents in Hindu mythology. Residing in Vaikuntha, Vishnu sleeps upon Adishesha in a perpetual slumber in his form of Narayana.

Vishvaksena

Vishvaksena, also known as Senadhipathi (both meaning 'army-chief'), is the commander-in-chief of the army of Vishnu.

Harihara 

Shiva and Vishnu are both viewed as the ultimate form of god in different Hindu denominations. Harihara is a composite of half Vishnu and half Shiva, mentioned in literature such as the Vamana Purana (chapter 36), and in artwork found from mid 1st millennium CE, such as in the cave 1 and cave 3 of the 6th-century Badami cave temples. Another half Vishnu half Shiva form, which is also called Harirudra, is mentioned in Mahabharata.

Beyond Hinduism

Sikhism
Vishnu is referred to as Gorakh in the scriptures of Sikhism. For example, in verse 5 of Japji Sahib, the Guru ('teacher') is praised as who gives the word and shows the wisdom, and through whom the awareness of immanence is gained. Guru Nanak, according to Shackle and Mandair (2013), teaches that the Guru are "Shiva (isar), Vishnu (gorakh), Brahma (barma) and mother Parvati (parbati)," yet the one who is all and true cannot be described.

The Chaubis Avtar lists the 24 avatars of Vishnu, including Krishna, Rama, and Buddha. Similarly, the Dasam Granth includes Vishnu mythology that mirrors that found in the Vaishnav tradition. The latter is of particular importance to Sanatan Sikhs, including Udasis, Nirmalas, Nanakpanthis, Sahajdhari, and Keshdhari/Khalsa sects of Sikhism; however, the Khalsa Sikhs disagree with the Sanatan Sikhs. According to Sanatan Sikh writers, the Gurus of Sikhism were avatars of Vishnu, because the Gurus brought light in the age of darkness and saved people in a time of evil Mughal-era persecution.

Buddhism

While some Hindus consider Buddha as an incarnation of Vishnu, Buddhists in Sri Lanka venerate Vishnu as the custodian deity of Sri Lanka and protector of Buddhism.

Vishnu is also known as Upulvan or Upalavarṇā, meaning 'Blue Lotus coloured'. Some postulate that Uthpala varna was a local deity who later merged with Vishnu while another belief is that Utpalavarṇā was an early form of Vishnu before he became a supreme deity in Puranic Hinduism. According to the chronicles of Mahāvaṃsa, Cūḷavaṃsa, and folklore in Sri Lanka, Buddha himself handed over the custodianship to Vishnu. Others believe that Buddha entrusted this task to Sakra (Indra), who delegated this task of custodianship to Vishnu. Many Buddhist and Hindu shrines are dedicated to Vishnu in Sri Lanka. In addition to specific Vishnu Kovils or Devalayas, all Buddhist temples necessarily house shrine rooms (Devalayas) closer to the main Buddhist shrine dedicated to Vishnu.

John Holt states that Vishnu was one of the several Hindu gods and goddesses who were integrated into the Sinhala Buddhist religious culture, such as the 14th and 15th-century Lankatilaka and Gadaladeniya Buddhist temples. He states that the medieval Sinhala tradition encouraged Visnu worship (puja) as a part of Theravada Buddhism just like Hindu tradition incorporated the Buddha as an avatar of Vishnu, but contemporary Theravada monks are attempting to purge the Vishnu worship practice from Buddhist temples. According to Holt, the veneration of Vishnu in Sri Lanka is evidence of a remarkable ability over many centuries, to reiterate and reinvent culture as other ethnicities have been absorbed into their own. Though the Vishnu cult in Ceylon was formally endorsed by Kandyan kings in the early 1700s, Holt states that Vishnu images and shrines are among conspicuous ruins in the medieval capital Polonnaruwa.

Vishnu iconography such as statues and etchings have been found in archaeological sites of Southeast Asia, now predominantly of the Theravada Buddhist tradition. In Thailand, for example, statues of four-armed Vishnu have been found in provinces near Malaysia and dated to be from the 4th to 9th-century, and this mirror those found in ancient India. Similarly, Vishnu statues have been discovered from the 6th to 8th century eastern Prachinburi Province and central Phetchabun Province of Thailand and southern Đồng Tháp Province and An Giang Province of Vietnam. Krishna statues dated to the early 7th century to 9th century have been discovered in Takéo Province and other provinces of Cambodia.

Archeological studies have uncovered Vishnu statues on the islands of Indonesia, and these have been dated to the 5th century and thereafter. In addition to statues, inscriptions and carvings of Vishnu, such as those related to the "three steps of Vishnu" (Trivikrama) have been found in many parts of Buddhist southeast Asia. In some iconography, the symbolism of Surya, Vishnu and Buddha are fused.

In Japanese Buddhist pantheon, Vishnu is known as Bichū-ten (毘紐天), and he appears in Japanese texts such as the 13th century compositions of Nichiren.

In science 
4034 Vishnu is an asteroid discovered by Eleanor F. Helin. Vishnu rocks are a type of volcanic sediment found in the Grand Canyon, Arizona, USA. Consequently, mass formations are known as Vishnu's temples.

Outside Indian subcontinent

Indonesia

In Indonesia, Vishnu or Wisnu (Indonesian spelling) is a well-known figure in the world of wayang (Indonesian Puppetry), Wisnu is often referred to as the title Sanghyang Batara Wisnu. Wisnu is the god of justice or welfare, wisnu was the fifth son of Batara Guru and Batari Uma. He is the most powerful son of all the sons of Batara Guru.

Wisnu is described as a god who has bluish black or dark blue skin, has four arms, each of which holds a weapon, namely a mace, a lotus, a trumpet and a Cakra. He can also do tiwikrama, become an infinitely large giant.

According to Javanese mythology, Wisnu first came down to the world and became a king with the title Srimaharaja Suman. The country is called Medangpura, located in the present-day Central Java region. Then changed its name to Sri Maharaja Matsyapati. In addition, according to the Javanese wayang puppet version, Batara Wisnu also incarnates
Srimaharaja Kanwa, Resi Wisnungkara, Prabu Arjunasasrabahu, Sri Ramawijaya, Sri Batara Kresna, Prabu Airlangga, Prabu Jayabaya, Prabu Anglingdarma.

In Javanese mythology, Wisnu also incarnated as a matsya (fish) to kill the giant Hargragiwa who stole the Veda. Become Narasingha (human with a tiger head) to destroy King Hiranyakashipu. He once intended to become a Wimana (dwarf) to defeat Ditya Bali. Batara Wisnu also incarnated in Ramaparasu to destroy gandarwa. Incarnated as Arjunasasra or Arjunawijaya to defeat King Rahwana. The last one was for King Krishna to become the great Pandavas parampara or advisor to get rid of greed and evil committed by the Kauravas.

Sang Hyang Wisnu has a mount in the form of a giant garuda named Bhirawan. Because of his affection for the garuda he rode, Bhirawan was then adopted as son-in-law, married to one of his daughters named Dewi Kastapi.

Temples

Some of the earliest surviving grand Vishnu temples in India have been dated to the Gupta Empire period. The Sarvatobhadra temple in Jhansi, Uttar Pradesh, for example, is dated to the early 6th century and features the ten avatars of Vishnu. Its design based on a square layout and Vishnu iconography broadly follows the 1st millennium Hindu texts on architecture and construction such as the Brihat Samhita and Visnudharmottarapurana.

Archaeological evidence suggest that Vishnu temples and iconography probably were already in existence by the 1st century BCE. The most significant Vishnu-related epigraphy and archaeological remains are the two 1st century BCE inscriptions in Rajasthan which refer to temples of Sankarshana and Vasudeva, the Besnagar Garuda column of 100 BCE which mentions a Bhagavata temple, another inscription in Naneghat cave in Maharashtra by a Queen Naganika that also mentions Sankarshana, Vasudeva along with other major Hindu deities and several discoveries in Mathura relating to Vishnu, all dated to about the start of the common era.

The Padmanabhaswamy Temple in Thiruvananthapuram, Kerala, is dedicated to Vishnu. The temple has attracted huge donations in gold and precious stones over its long history.

List of temples

108 Divya Desams
Venkateswara Temple
Padmanabhaswamy Temple
Ranganathaswamy Temple, Srirangam
Jagannath Temple, Puri
Badrinath Temple
Swaminarayan temples
Candi Wisnu, Prambanan, Java, Indonesia
Angkor Wat , Cambodia
Birla Mandir
Dashavatara Temple, Deogarh
Pundarikakshan Perumal Temple
Kallalagar temple , Madurai

Gallery

References

Works cited

 [Via Google Books

External links
 
 
 
 

 
Characters in the Bhagavata Purana
Commerce gods
Hindu gods
Names of God in Hinduism
Rigvedic deities
Savior gods
Solar gods
Triple gods
Vaishnavism
Maintenance deities
Light gods
Time and fate gods